Boston City Council elections were held on November 2, 1993. All thirteen seats (nine district representatives and four at-large members) were contested in the general election, while ten seats (six districts and the four at-large members) had also been contested in the preliminary election held on September 21, 1993.

The large number of preliminary candidates followed a reduction in the number of signatures required for a candidate to appear on the ballot, from 1500 to 500.

Since the composition of the council changed in 1984, to four at-large seats and nine district representatives, no candidate who had run for re-election had lost. However, two incumbents—Anthony Crayton and David Scondras—were defeated by challengers in this election.

At-large
Councillors John A. Nucci and Dapper O'Neil were re-elected. Councillors Bruce Bolling and Rosaria Salerno did not seek re-election, as they were running for Mayor of Boston; their seats were won by Richard P. Iannella and Peggy Davis-Mullen. Iannella was the son of former Council president Christopher A. Iannella, while unsuccessful candidate Michael Travaglini was the brother of outgoing District 1 Councillor Robert Travaglini.

District 1
Councillor Robert Travaglini, who had been elected to the Massachusetts Senate in November 1992, did not seek re-election to the City Council; his seat was won by Diane J. Modica.

 per preliminary election recount

District 2
Councillor James M. Kelly was re-elected.

District 3
Councillor James E. Byrne did not seek re-election; his seat was won by Maureen Feeney, his neighborhood liaison.

District 4
Councillor Charles Yancey was re-elected.

District 5
The seat of Councillor Thomas Menino, who had been acting mayor since July 1993 and won the mayoral election, was won by Daniel F. Conley.

District 6
Councillor Maura Hennigan was re-elected.

District 7
Councillor Anthony Crayton was defeated by Gareth R. Saunders.

 per preliminary election recount

 Saunders was later declared the winner, due to discovery of a tally sheet error; his victory was subsequently confirmed via recount.

District 8
Councillor David Scondras was defeated by Thomas M. Keane Jr.

District 9
Councillor Brian J. McLaughlin was re-elected.

See also
 List of members of Boston City Council
 Boston mayoral election, 1993

References

Further reading
 
 
 
 

City Council election
Boston City Council elections
Boston City Council election
Boston City Council